Felisa Mary (1892–1956) was a Spanish-born Argentinian film actress. She appeared in more than forty films during her career, which coincided with the Golden Age of Argentine Cinema.

Selected filmography
 When the Heart Sings (1941)
 Sweethearts for the Girls (1941)
 When Spring Makes a Mistake (1944)
 Back in the Seventies (1945)
 The Three Rats (1946)
 The Orchid (1951)
 Detective (1954)

References

Bibliography 
 Finkielman, Jorge. The Film Industry in Argentina: An Illustrated Cultural History. McFarland, 24 Dec 2003.

External links 
 

1892 births
1956 deaths
Argentine stage actresses
Argentine film actresses
Spanish stage actresses
Spanish film actresses
People from Bilbao
Spanish emigrants to Argentina